Space Data Integrator is a process/service platform or tool being developed by the US FAA to integrate space launch and reentry into the US National Airspace System.

History
The project was initiated in 2015.

No funds for SDI were included in the FAA 2018 budget request.

In March 2018 the FAA initiated a Market Survey on the requirements for SDI.

References

Further reading
 Improving the Integration of Launch and Reentry Operations into the National Airspace System Mazzotta and Murray. 2015?

Aerospace engineering